is a former Japanese woman speed skater. She represented Japan in the 1992 Winter Olympics and competed in the women's 500 metres and in the women's 1000 metres. She also went onto participate at the 1990 Asian Winter Games in the speed skating event.

References

External links

1967 births
Living people
Japanese female speed skaters
Olympic speed skaters of Japan
Speed skaters at the 1992 Winter Olympics
Speed skaters at the 1990 Asian Winter Games
Sportspeople from Hokkaido
20th-century Japanese women